Nancy Drew and the Hidden Staircase is a 2019 American teen mystery comedy film directed by Katt Shea with a screenplay by Nina Fiore and John Herrera, based on the book of the same name by Carolyn Keene which was earlier adapted for a 1939 film. The film, produced by A Very Good Production and Red 56 and distributed by Warner Bros. Pictures, stars Sophia Lillis in the role of Nancy Drew, as she investigates a haunted house. It also stars Zoe Renee, Mackenzie Graham, Laura Slade Wiggins, Sam Trammell, and Linda Lavin in supporting roles.

Nancy Drew and the Hidden Staircase was released in the United States on March 15, 2019, by Warner Bros. Pictures. The film received mixed reviews from critics, with praise for Lillis' performance and humor, but criticized its muddled plot and inconsistent tone.

Plot
After her mother's death, 16-year-old sleuth Nancy Drew and her father Carson relocate from Chicago to rural River Heights. While Nancy struggles to fit in, Carson is active in local politics, fighting the development of a train line through the town. A local thug named Willie Wharton threatens Nancy one night to try to scare her father into backing down.

While performing community service as punishment for a prank on a school bully, Nancy meets Flora, an elderly woman needing help with an apparent haunting in her home. Excited by the mystery, Nancy stays overnight at Flora's home, along with Flora's niece Helen. That night, strange things begin to happen, with lights going out and then exploding, cabinet doors and drawers opening, and a cloaked figure appearing and warning Nancy to give up her mystery.

The next day, Nancy believes that someone broke in and tried scaring them out. Nancy and Helen investigate, and they find a secret passage that leads outside, revealing how the "ghost" entered the house. The secret passage also contains props the intruder used to simulate a haunting, such as a rigged fuse box to manipulate the lights in the house. The rest of the strange phenomenon is explained by a rig that emits concentrated nutmeg through the house's air conditioning, which triggers dangerous hallucinations.

Later, Nancy realizes her father, who is staying out of town on a business trip, has not checked in with her or her aunt Hannah recently. She calls her father's friend Nate, who tells her that Carson's meeting is at a campsite and reception must be spotty. Nancy is not convinced, as Carson had told her he would be staying at a hotel.

Worried that something has happened to him, Nancy and Helen head to Carson's hotel. They discover that he never checked out, and his cell phone is still in his room. Security footage from the previous night reveals Carson was ambushed and kidnapped by Wharton. Nancy's friends Bess and George find out that Wharton is also the man who bought the nutmeg used at Flora's house, and Nancy realizes Carson is being kept in the secret passage there. She and Helen head to Flora's house, where they discover Wharton and Nate holding Carson and Flora hostage. It is revealed that Wharton and Nate were working together to sabotage the anti-train movement, and that they intended to force Flora to sell her house so the line could be built through her property. When Nancy's investigation proved that the house was not haunted, they were forced to use other means to secure the land. Nancy and Helen work together to save Carson and Flora from their captors, who are then arrested by the police.

The next day at school, Nancy, George, and Bess welcome Helen into their circle of friends, and together they plan their next adventure at the Lilac Inn.

Cast
 Sophia Lillis as Nancy Drew
 Zoe Renee as George Fayne
 Mackenzie Graham as Bess Marvin
 Laura Slade Wiggins as Helen Corning
 Sam Trammell as Carson Drew
 Linda Lavin as Flora
 Andrea Anders as Hannah Gruen
 Jesse C. Boyd as Willie Wharton
 Jay DeVon Johnson as Sheriff Marchbanks
 Andrew Matthew Welch as Deputy Patrick
 Jon Briddell as Nate
 Josh Daugherty as Mr. Barnes
 Evan Castelloe as Derek

Production
On April 20, 2018, it was reported that Sophia Lillis would star in the film adaptation of Nancy Drew and the Hidden Staircase, which would be produced by Ellen DeGeneres, Jeff Kleeman, and Chip Diggins for Warner Bros. Pictures. In June, other casting was announced which included Zoe Renee as George, Mackenzie Graham as Bess, Laura Slade Wiggins as Helen, Sam Trammell as Carson, Linda Lavin as Flora, and Andrea Anders as Hannah, along with Jay DeVon Johnson, Andrew Matthew Welch, Jon Briddell, Josh Daugherty, Evan Castelloe, and Jesse C. Boyd. Principal photography on the film took place that same month in Monroe, Georgia.

Music
The score of the film was composed by Sherri Chung. Emily Bear composed and sings the songs "More than Just a Girl" and "Daylight".

Release

Marketing
On January 18, 2019, DeGeneres announced exclusively that the film would be released in theaters on March 15; she also debuted a trailer. On February 19, 2019, Warner Bros. Pictures released a short clip from the film. In addition, DeGeneres interviewed Lillis on her talk show to promote the film.

Box office
As of August 2020, Nancy Drew and the Hidden Staircase grossed $623,088 at the box office, and a further $322,939 with home video sales.

Critical response

The website's consensus reads, "Elevated by a well-cast Sophia Lillis, Nancy Drew and the Hidden Staircase leads audiences into a genially entertaining new take on the venerable character." On Metacritic, the film has a score of 55 out of 100, based on reviews from 10 critics, indicating "mixed or average reviews".

Peter Debruge of Variety praised the "consistently clever script" saying it "isn't nearly as interested in the mystery as it is in Nancy Drew herself, or in the circle of characters and relationships that surround her. And that’s the smart way to approach such a case, since the movie was clearly intended to be more than a one-off." He also praises Lillis for her performance and says she is "the freshest thing to happen to Nancy Drew in decades, making it clear that casting was the solution that has so often eluded this series in its jump from page to screen in the past."

Accolades
Nancy Drew and the Hidden Staircase was nominated for Best DVD or Blu-ray Release at the 45th Saturn Awards.

References

External links
 
 
 
 
 Nancy Drew and the Hidden Staircase trailer via YouTube

2019 comedy-drama films
2019 films
2010s adventure comedy-drama films
2010s mystery comedy-drama films
2010s teen comedy-drama films
American adventure comedy-drama films
American detective films
American mystery comedy-drama films
American teen comedy-drama films
Films based on Nancy Drew
Films directed by Katt Shea
Films shot in Georgia (U.S. state)
Teen adventure films
Teen mystery films
Warner Bros. films
2010s English-language films
2010s American films